The Eastern Canadian blizzard of March 1971 was a severe winter storm that struck portions of eastern Canada from March 3 to March 5, 1971. The storm was also nicknamed the "Storm of the Century" in Quebec. Heavy snowfall was also recorded in eastern Ontario and northern New Brunswick as well as parts of the Northeastern United States. The storm itself was responsible for the deaths of 17 people in Montreal (30 province-wide) along with numerous other injuries directly and indirectly attributed to the blizzard.

Blizzard event

A coastal low-pressure system, called a Nor'easter, developed across the coastal United States late on March 3, 1971. The system rapidly intensified as it moved towards the Northeast United States as well as Quebec and eastern Ontario. The storm centre had a rapid pressure drop to  while it was centred over New York before moving across New Brunswick exiting the province of Quebec during the morning of March 5.

Snow started across most of the affected areas on March 3 with the peak of the storm during most of the day on March 4 where for a period of up to 17 hours there was at least moderate snow and blowing snow in Montreal. Visibility was also significantly reduced for nearly 24 hours. The  received makes it one of the heaviest snowfalls on records for Montreal with the  received on March 4 being the snowiest day on record.

Elsewhere across Quebec,  of snow fell in the Laurentides Wildlife Reserve north of Quebec City while  of snow fell locally in the Gaspésie, Bas-Saint-Laurent and Eastern Townships regions south of the Saint Lawrence River. Up to  fell in the Ottawa and Quebec City regions.
The heavy snow was accompanied by damaging wind gusts of near hurricane-force, which created snowdrifts of up to two stories high in some places. Widespread power outages were reported and some were left without power for up to ten days. The city of Montreal was left paralyzed following the storm for a few days. Bus service was stopped: snowmobiles and the Montreal Metro were the easiest transportation options possible throughout the city, while bridges and roads were completely shut down. For the first time in over 50 years a Montreal Canadiens National Hockey League game at the Montreal Forum was postponed. Seventeen people were killed in Montreal while there were several other injuries related to the storm. Fatalities were resulted by heart attacks or people stuck inside stranded vehicles. At least two people were killed in the Quebec City region and at least 30 fatalities were reported province-wide. It took at least 36 hours to clean up the worst of the storm and to resume regular traffic although snow clearing operations lasted for several days. Initial damage estimates were at about $1 million (1971 dollars) for central Quebec including 50 homes that received roof damage. Businesses also sustained window damage some due to flying debris particularly in the Limoilou area of Quebec City.

Historical perspective

The 1970–1971 winter season was the worst on record for many areas of eastern Ontario and southern Quebec in terms of all-time snowfall records. Quebec City also had their worst season in 1970–1971 with  before it was broken in 2007–2008 when just over  fell.

Storms in December 1969 left  in three days across the city making that event the most significant snowfall event from one system. Other systems in 1954, 1955, and 2001 had higher total snowfalls for a single event making the 1971 even the fifth-heaviest single-event snowfall.

Thirty-one people were killed by the mudslide.

References

External links
 CRIACC Commemorative report on the Montreal Storm of the Century
 Hourly Observations at Trudeau International Airport on March 4, 1971
 Hourly Observations at Ottawa International Airport on March 4, 1971
 Hourly Observation at Québec/Jean Lesage International Airport on March 4, 1971
 Radio-Canada video of the Blizzard of 1971

1971 natural disasters
Natural disasters in Quebec
Natural disasters in Ontario
Blizzards in Canada
1971 disasters in Canada